Les Voix de Magma  (also known as "Les Voix" Concert 1992 Douarnenez or Akt I) is a live album by French rock band Magma, featuring vocal-heavy, largely acoustic reworkings of well-known pieces by Magma and Christian Vander's Offering. It was released in 1992 on Akt Records.

Track listing 
 "Ëmëhntëht-Rê" - 3:39 (C. Vander)
 "C'est Pour Nous" - 7:56 (C. Vander)
 "Zëss (Extrait)" - 17:18 (C. Vander)
 "Ẁurdah Ïtah" - 15:46 (C. Vander)

Personnel 
 Christian Vander - vocals, piano, drums
 Stella Vander - vocals
 Addie Déat - vocals
 Julie Vander - vocals
 Bénédicte Ragu - vocals
 Isabelle Feuillebois - vocals
 Jean-Christophe Gamet - vocals
 Alex Ferrand - vocals
 Pierre-Michel Sivadier - keyboards
 Simon Goubert - piano, keyboards
 Philippe Dardelle - contrabass
 Francisco Juan Guerrero - engineer

Magma (band) albums
1992 live albums